Native Plants Journal is a peer-reviewed scientific journal established to disperse "practical information about planting and growing North American (Canada, Mexico, and the United States) native plants for conservation, restoration, reforestation, landscaping, highway corridors, and related uses." It is published by the University of Wisconsin Press three times a year.

Native Plants Journal is an official partner journal of the Society for Ecological Restoration.

History
The Native Plants Journal was established in January 2000 as a cooperative effort between the University of Idaho and the USDA Forest Service, with assistance from the Natural Resources Conservation Service and the USDA Agricultural Research Service. The Reforestation, Nurseries and Genetic Resources (RNGR) department of the USDA Forest Service were the originators of the idea of having a journal that covers native plant species. This led to an agreement in the spring of 1999 between the Service and the Forest Research Nursery at the University of Idaho to publish material that would be incorporated into the first issue of the journal. The journal was published by the Indiana University Press between the fall of 2004 and fall 2010. It moved the University of Wisconsin Press in the spring of 2011.

References

External links

Native Plant Network

English-language journals
University of Wisconsin Press academic journals
2000 establishments in the United States
Publications established in 2000
Botany journals
Triannual journals